What Is Not to Love is the second album by indie-rock band Imperial Teen. It is the follow-up to their first full-length record, Seasick (1996), and was released in 1998 via Slash Records.

Critical reception
Entertainment Weekly wrote that "there's something fundamentally warm and cuddly about the mixed-gender quartet's seductive mix of indie-rock cliches (distorted guitars, diffident vocals) and hook-and-harmony-informed popcraft".

Track listing
All songs written by Imperial Teen.
"Open Season" – 	2:25
"Birthday Girl" – 	3:36
"Yoo Hoo" – 		3:30
"Lipstick" – 		4:00
"Alone in the Grass" – 7:15
"Crucible" – 		4:18
"The Beginning" – 	2:39
"Year of the Tan" – 	3:05
"Seven" – 		4:33
"Hooray" (live) – 	7:11
"Beauty" – 		2:52

Personnel

Band members
Roddy Bottum – 	guitar, vocals
Will Schwartz – 	guitar, vocals
Jone Stebbins – 	bass, backing vocals
Lynn Truell – 	drums, backing vocals

Technical staff
Mark Freegard –	producer, engineer, mixing
Andre Moran –	engineer
Mark Saunders –	mixing
Greg Freeman –	engineer
Bill Inglot –	mastering
Matt Kelley –	engineer
Mickey Petralia –	producer, mixing
Chris Scard –	second engineer
Gabriel Shepard –	second engineer
Matt Wallace –	mixing
Howard Willing –	second engineer

References

1998 albums
Imperial Teen albums
Slash Records albums